Machač or Macháč (Czech feminine: Machačová or Macháčová) is a Czech surname. Notable people include:

 Jan Macháč, Czech canoeist
 Jarmila Machačová (born 1986), Czech racing cyclist
 Jaroslav Machač (born 1926), Czech speedway rider
 Oldřich Machač (1946–2011), Czech ice hockey player
 Patrik Machač (born 1994), Czech ice hockey player
 Tomáš Macháč (born 2000), Czech tennis player

See also
 
 MacHack

Czech-language surnames